On 26 February 2023, hundreds of Israeli settlers went on a violent late-night rampage in Huwara and other Palestinian villages in the Israeli occupied West Bank as a revenge attack for the deadly shooting of two Israeli settlers in the same town by an unidentified armed Palestinian. The events left one civilian dead and 100 others injured, four critically, and the town ablaze. It was the worst flare-up of Israeli settler violence in the northern West Bank in decades.

Israeli soldiers were in the area while the rampage by the settlers unfolded, and did not intervene. The rampage was called a pogrom by an Israeli commander in charge of the area. The same day, Israeli and Palestinian officials issued a joint declaration in Aqaba, Jordan to counter the recent round of Israeli–Palestinian violence.

In the rampage's aftermath, Israeli Finance Minister Bezalel Smotrich, a settler leader in charge of the administration of the West Bank, called for Huwara to be "wiped out" by the Israeli army. Condemnations from the United States, European Union and Arab countries led to Smotrich retracting his comments and claiming they were said in the heat of the moment.

Background 

The rampage in Huwara followed shortly after the deadly shooting by a Palestinian gunman of two Israeli settlers from Har Brakha, an Israeli settlement near Huwara, earlier the same day.

The attack came juxtaposed against a joint declaration earlier that day in Aqaba, Jordan, by Israeli and Palestinian officials expressing a desire to work towards calming the latest round of violence.

Some 700,000 Israeli settlers now live in the West Bank and East Jerusalem, in settlements viewed as illegal by the international community. Hardline settlers in the West Bank more generally frequently commit violence against Palestinians and vandalize Palestinian land and property, but rarely on the scale of the rampage in Huwara. 

Settler violence has generally been steadily on the rise in the West Bank in recent months, with Huwara previously having been subjected to an October blockade imposed by settlers and backed by Israeli soldiers.

In the first two months of 2023, intercommunal violence led to the killings of 62 Palestinians and 14 Israelis. The year of 2022 was the deadliest for Palestinians living in the West Bank and East Jerusalem since 2004, according to B’Tselem, with nearly 150 Palestinians and 30 Israelis killed.

Rampage 
On the night of 26 February 2023, hundreds of Israeli settlers attacked Huwara and three nearby villages, torching hundreds of Palestinian homes (some with people in them), businesses, a school, and numerous vehicles. One Palestinian man was shot dead.

Although the violence had been anticipated, and the Israeli military had cordoned off the area, the soldiers remained on the sidelines during the siege, rather than intervene. Israel's West Bank army commander defended the inaction saying that they had not anticipated the ferocity of the attack, and were not prepared to deal with it. He described the event as "a pogrom done by outlaws"—a term commonly applied to eastern European mob attacks upon Jews during the 1800s and early 1900s.

The Palestinian health ministry said a 37-year-old man was shot to death by the settlers, while the Palestinian Red Crescent medical service said another two people were wounded by gunfire, a third was stabbed and a fourth beaten with an iron bar. Ninety-five others were said to be suffering from teargas inhalation.

Alongside the physical violence against local residents, the settlers set fire to approximately 30 homes and cars, according to one source. Other sources say 200 buildings were set ablaze in four Palestinian villages. Social media showed large blazes burning across the town and the violence reportedly lasted throughout the night and continued on into Monday morning.

Aftermath 

There were no soldiers, police or Border Police in Huwara during the riots. The next day the rioters were still in control. Groups of masked Jews were checking vehicles looking for Palestinians. Israeli soldiers nearby did not intervene. "Reports of a large Israeli army presence in the town existed only on paper". Settler attacks on Palestinian communities continued through 28 February.

As of 28 February, of only eight suspects detained in connection with the rampage, all had been released, three to house arrest. On 1 March, eight further suspects believed to have taken part in the assault were arrested, one of whom was released the same day. The IDF commander responsible for the area, Major-General Yehuda Fuchs, described the event as a "pogrom carried out by outlaws." On 2 March, the Israeli Defense Ministry placed two of the individuals, one a minor, in administrative detention after a Jerusalem court ordered the police to release the remaining seven detained suspects.

Reactions

Israeli 
Israeli Prime Minister Benjamin Netanyahu appealed for calm on Sunday evening as footage of the violence emerged and spoke out against vigilantism. Israeli President Isaac Herzog condemned the rampage, stating, "This is not our way. It is criminal violence against innocents."

Israeli Finance Minister Bezalel Smotrich, a settler leader now largely in charge of the administration of the West Bank, who had earlier called for "striking the cities of terror and its instigators without mercy, with tanks and helicopters", appealed to his fellow settlers to not take the law into their own hands, and to let the army and government do their jobs.  

However, Smotrich later called for Huwara to be "wiped out" by the Israeli government. Smotrich's remark drew international condemnation, including from the U.N. Secretary General, Jordan, the United Arab Emirates, and others. The United States State Department demanded that Israeli Prime Minister Benjamin Netanyahu reject the remark. Smotrich's remark came just before a major fund-raising event for Israel, in the U.S., where Smotrich was to appear. The White House indicated U.S. officials would not meet with him, and various Jewish rights organizations called for the State Department to deny him entry.

Other members of Israel's ruling coalition proffered other sentiments. Zvika Fogel, of the ultra-nationalist Otzma Yehudit, said he saw the violence "in a very good light" in response to a question on Army Radio in which the interviewer referred to the rampage as a 'pogrom'.

Investigation
On 1 March, Israeli Attorney General Gali Baharav-Miara opened an investigation into lawmaker Zvika Fogel of the far-right Otzma Yehudit party and a member of the Israeli government coalition on "suspicion of incitement to terrorism"; Fogel had publicly supported the rampage. 22 Israeli legal experts wrote to the attorney general to investigate pro-settler government MKs, including far-right minister Bezalel Smotrich, for "inducing war crimes" by their public support for the riots. Going further, Smotrich, when asked why he liked a tweet by Samaria Regional Council deputy mayor Davidi Ben Zion calling "to wipe out the village of Huwara today", said "Because I think the village of Huwara needs to be wiped out. I think the State of Israel should do it."

Palestinian 
Palestinian President Mahmoud Abbas criticized events as "the terrorist acts carried out by settlers under the protection of the occupation forces tonight," and blamed the Israeli government.

International 
The European Union noted its alarm at the violence called on authorities on both sides "stop this endless cycle of violence." The UK ambassador to Israel called on Israel to address the settler violence and bring those responsible to justice.

US State Department spokesman Ned Price said violence underscored "the imperative to immediately de-escalate tensions in words and deeds."

See also 
Timeline of the Israeli–Palestinian conflict in 2023
Israeli settler violence

References

2023 riots
Anti-Palestinian sentiment in the Middle East
February 2023 crimes in Asia
Terrorist incidents in the West Bank in 2023
Ethnic riots
Nablus Governorate
Israeli settler violence